Frank Hemmer (born 28 April 1963, in Hagen-Hohenlimburg) is a West German-German slalom canoeist who competed from the mid-1980s to the early 1990s. He won a gold medal for West Germany in the C2 event at the 1989 ICF Canoe Slalom World Championships in Savage River, Maryland in the United States. He also won three bronze medals at the ICF Canoe Slalom World Championships in the C2 team event (1987, 1989, 1991).

Hemmer competed for Germany at the 1992 Summer Olympics in Barcelona, finishing 13th in the C2 event.

His partner in the boat throughout the whole of his career was Thomas Loose.

World Cup individual podiums

References

1963 births
Canoeists at the 1992 Summer Olympics
German male canoeists
Living people
Olympic canoeists of Germany
Medalists at the ICF Canoe Slalom World Championships
People from Hagen